Rukometni klub Brskovo is a Montenegrin handball club from Mojkovac, that plays in Montenegrin First League. RK Mojkovac is former champion of Montenegro.

History

The club was formed during the 60's as RK Brskovo. In SFR Yugoslavia, Brskovo played mostly in the Montenegrin Republic League, with few seasons in the Second League - 'West'. After the breakup of SFR Yugoslavia, Brskovo became the participant of the First Handball League of FR Yugoslavia, but only for one season - 1992/93. In the next years, the club participated in the Second League, but with the 21st century it was relegated, and in 2004 completely dissolved.

The re-formation of the club, under the name RK Mojkovac, started with the Montenegrin independence. Mojkovac became a member of Montenegrin First League at 2006, and in next year, club gained first promotion to the European cups. Hard days for Mojkovac came during the 2008. At the end of the season 2007/08, the club was relegated into the Second League.

In their returning First League season (2010/11), RK Mojkovac won their first title as the champion of Montenegro. In the next seasons, Mojkovac was among the better members of the First League.

Trophies

Champion of Montenegro (1) 
2011.

First League seasons

In the era of FR Yugoslavia, RK Mojkovac (then RK Brskovo) participated in the First League during the season 1992/93.

RK Mojkovac played in the Montenegrin First League during the seasons 2006/07, 2007/08, 2008/09, 2010/11, 2011/12, 2012/13, 2013/14, 2014/15.

European Cups

Mojkovac played three seasons in the EHF European competitions:

2007/08 - EHF Challenge Cup

2011/12 - EHF Cup

2012/13 - EHF Cup

Teams

Notable players

 Žarko Pejović
 Darko Stanić
 Saša Adžić
 Anđelko Adžić 
 Željko Jaćimović 
 Borislav Ljubojević

External links
Handball Federation of Montenegro

Mojkovac
Handball clubs established in 1965
1965 establishments in Yugoslavia
Mojkovac